Luis Manuel Fernández de Portocarrero y de Guzmán, (8 January 1635, Palma del Río – 14 September 1709, Toledo, Spain) was a Spanish prelate, who was cardinal archbishop of Toledo. Uncle of Luis Antonio Tomás de Portocarrero y Moscoso, 5th Count, who became a Grandee of Spain, 2nd class, since 1707 by King Felipe V of Spain.

Biography

A younger son of the 1st marquis of Almenara, title of 11 July 1623, and 3rd Count of Palma del Rio, title of 22 November 1507, Luis Andres. He became dean of Toledo early, and was made cardinal on 5 August 1669.

Till 1677 he lived at Rome as cardinal protector of the Spanish nation. In 1677 he was appointed interim viceroy of Sicily, counsellor of state and archbishop of Toledo. He ceased to be viceroy of Sicily in 1678, being replaced by Vicente de Gonzaga y Doria, (1602–1694)  former Viceroy of Catalonia, 1664–1667, not to be confounded with his nephew Vincenzo Gonzaga, Duke of Guastalla, (1634–1714). On 16 January 1678, he was consecrated bishop by Jaime de Palafox y Cardona, Archbishop of Palermo, with Giovanni Roano e Corrionero, Archbishop of Monreale, and Francesco Arata, Bishop of Lipari, serving as co-consecrators. As archbishop of Toledo he exerted himself to protect the clergy from the obligation to pay the excises or octroi duties known as "the millions" and thereby helped to perpetuate the financial embarrassments of the government.

His position rather than any personal qualities enabled him to play an important part in a great crisis of European politics. The decrepit King Charles II was childless, and the disposal of his inheritance became a question of great interest to the European powers. Fernández de Portocarrero was induced to become a supporter of the French party, which desired that the crown should be left to one of the family of Louis XIV, and not to a member of the king's own family, the Habsburgs. The great authority of Fernández de Portocarrero as cardinal and primate of Spain was used to persuade, or rather to terrify the unhappy king into making a will in favor of the duke of Anjou, Philip V.

He acted as regent until the new king reached Spain and hoped to be powerful under his rule. But the king's French advisers were aware that Spain required a thorough financial and administrative reform. Fernández de Portocarrero could not see, and indeed had not either the intelligence or the honesty to see, the necessity. He was incapable, obstinate and perfectly selfish. The new rulers soon found that he must be removed and he was ordered to return to his diocese. When in 1706 the Austrian party appeared likely to gain the upper hand, Fernández de Portocarrero was led by spite and vexation to go over to them.

When fortune changed he returned to his allegiance to Philip V, and as the government was unwilling to offend the Church he escaped banishment. In 1709 when Louis XIV made a pretence of withdrawing from the support of his grandson, the cardinal made a great display of loyalty. He died in September of the same year and by his orders the words Hic jacet pulvis, cinis, et nihil were put on his tomb (here lies dust, ashes and nothing).

Episcopal succession

References

External links
 de Portocarreromatica/portocarrero.html Short biography
Catholic-Hierarchy biography

 

1635 births
1709 deaths
Regents of Spain
18th-century Spanish cardinals
17th-century Spanish cardinals
Archbishops of Toledo
17th-century Roman Catholic archbishops in Spain
18th-century Roman Catholic archbishops in Spain
Viceroys of Sicily
Grandees of Spain